A system of measurement is a collection of units of measurement and rules relating them to each other. Systems of measurement have historically been important, regulated and defined for the purposes of science and commerce.

History

The French Revolution gave rise to the metric system, and this has spread around the world, replacing most customary units of measure. In most systems, length (distance), mass, and time are base quantities.

Later science developments showed that an electromagnetic quantity such as electric charge or electric current could be added to extend the set of base quantities. Gaussian units have only length, mass, and time as base quantities, with no separate electromagnetic dimension. Other quantities, such as power and speed, are derived from the base set: for example, speed is distance per unit time. Historically a wide range of units was used for the same type of quantity: in different contexts, length was measured in inches, feet, yards, fathoms, rods, chains, furlongs, miles, nautical miles, stadia, leagues, with conversion factors that were not powers of ten.

The preference for a more universal and consistent system only gradually spread with the growth of international trade and science. Changing a measurement system has costs in the near term, which results in resistance to such a change. The substantial benefit of conversion to a more rational and internationally consistent system of measurement has been recognized and promoted by scientists, engineers and politicians, and has resulted in most of the world adopting a commonly agreed metric system.

In antiquity, systems of measurement were defined locally: the different units might be defined independently according to the length of a king's thumb or the size of his foot, the length of stride, the length of arm, or maybe the weight of water in a keg of specific size, perhaps itself defined in hands and knuckles. The unifying characteristic is that there was some definition based on some standard. Eventually cubits and strides gave way to "customary units" to meet the needs of merchants and scientists.

In the metric system and other recent systems, underlying relationships between quantities, as expressed by formulae of physics such as Newton's laws of motion, is used to select a small number of base quantities for which a unit is defined for each, from which all other units may be derived. Secondary units (multiples and submultiples) are derived from these base and derived units by multiplying by powers of ten, so for example where the unit of length is the metre; a distance of 1 m is 1,000 millimetres, or 0.001 kilometres.

Current practice

Metrication is complete or nearly complete in almost all countries. US customary units are heavily used in the United States and to some degree in Liberia. Traditional Burmese units of measurement are used in Burma. U.S. units are used in limited contexts in Canada due to the large volume of trade; there is also considerable use of imperial weights and measures, despite de jure Canadian conversion to metric.

A number of other jurisdictions have laws mandating or permitting other systems of measurement in some or all contexts, such as the United Kingdom – whose road signage legislation, for instance, only allows distance signs displaying imperial units (miles or yards) – or Hong Kong.

Metric units are virtually always used in science, frequently in the military, and partially in industry in the United States, but customary units are primarily used in households. At retail stores, the litre (spelled 'liter' in the U.S.) is a commonly used unit for volume, especially on bottles of beverages, and milligrams, rather than grains, are used for medications. Some other non-SI units are still in international use, such as nautical miles and knots in aviation and shipping.

Metric system

Metric systems of units have evolved since the adoption of the first well-defined system in France in 1795. During this evolution the use of these systems has spread throughout the world, first to non-English-speaking countries, and then to English speaking countries.

Multiples and submultiples of metric units are related by powers of ten and their names are formed with prefixes. This relationship is compatible with the decimal system of numbers and it contributes greatly to the convenience of metric units.

In the early metric system there were two base units, the metre for length and the gram for mass. The other units of length and mass, and all units of area, volume, and derived units such as density were derived from these two base units.

Mesures usuelles (French for customary measurements) were a system of measurement introduced as a compromise between the metric system and traditional measurements. It was used in France from 1812 to 1839.

A number of variations on the metric system have been in use. These include gravitational systems, the centimetre–gram–second systems (cgs) useful in science, the metre–tonne–second system (mts) once used in the USSR and the metre–kilogram–second system (mks). In some engineering fields, like computer-aided design, millimetre–gram–second (mmgs) is also used.

The current international standard for the metric system is the International System of Units ( or SI). It is a system in which all units can be expressed in terms of seven units.  The units that serves as the SI base units are the metre, kilogram, second, ampere, kelvin, mole, and candela.

Imperial and US customary units

Both imperial units and US customary units derive from earlier English units. Imperial units were mostly used in the former British Empire and the British Commonwealth, but in all these countries they have been largely supplanted by the metric system. They are still used for some applications in the United Kingdom but have been mostly replaced by the metric system in commercial, scientific, and industrial applications. US customary units, however, are still the main system of measurement in the United States. While some steps towards metrication have been made (mainly in the late 1960s and early 1970s), the customary units have a strong hold due to the vast industrial infrastructure and commercial development.

While imperial and US customary systems are closely related, there are a number of differences between them. Units of length and area (the inch, foot, yard, mile, etc.) have been identical since the adoption of the International Yard and Pound Agreement; however, America and, formerly, India retained older definitions for surveying purposes. This gave rise to the US survey foot for instance. The avoirdupois units of mass and weight differ for units larger than a pound (lb). The imperial system uses a stone of 14 lb, a long hundredweight of 112 lb and a long ton of 2240 lb. The stone is not used in the US and the hundredweights and tons are short: 100 lb and 2000 lb respectively.

Where these systems most notably differ is in their units of volume. A US fluid ounce (fl oz), about 29.6 millilitres (ml), is slightly larger than the imperial fluid ounce (about 28.4 ml). However, as there are 16 US fl oz to a US pint and 20 imp fl oz per imperial pint, the imperial pint is about 20% larger. The same is true of quarts, gallons, etc.; six US gallons are a little less than five imperial gallons.

The avoirdupois system served as the general system of mass and weight. In addition to this there are the troy and the apothecaries' systems. Troy weight was customarily used for precious metals, black powder and gemstones. The troy ounce is the only unit of the system in current use; it is used for precious metals. Although the troy ounce is larger than its avoirdupois equivalent, the pound is smaller. The obsolete troy pound was divided into 12 ounces, rather than the 16 ounces per pound of the avoirdupois system. The apothecaries' system was traditionally used in pharmacology, but has now been replaced by the metric system; it shared the same pound and ounce as the troy system but with different further subdivisions.

Natural units
Natural units are units of measurement defined in terms of universal physical constants in such a manner that selected physical constants take on the numerical value of one when expressed in terms of those units.  Natural units are so named because their definition relies on only properties of nature and not on any human construct. Varying systems of natural units are possible, depending on the choice of constants used.

Some examples are as follows:
 Geometrized unit systems are useful in relativistic physics. In these systems, speed of light and the gravitational constant are among the constants chosen.
 Planck units is system of geometrized units in which the reduced Planck constant is included in the list of defining constants. It is based on only properties of free space rather than of any object or particle.
 Stoney units is a system of geometrized units in which the Coulomb constant and the elementary charge are included.
 Hartree atomic units are a system of units used in atomic physics, particularly for describing the properties of electrons. The atomic units have been chosen to use several constants relating to the electron: the electron mass, the elementary charge, the Coulomb constant and the reduced Planck constant. The unit of energy in this system is the total energy of the electron in the Bohr atom and called the Hartree energy. The unit of length is the Bohr radius.

Non-standard units
Non-standard measurement units also found in books, newspapers etc., include:

Area
This is often used by the American public media for the sizes of large buildings or parks.
For example, "HSS vessels are aluminium catamarans about the size of a football pitch."
 Larger areas are also expressed as a multiple of the areas of certain American states, or subdivisions of the UK etc.

Energy
 A ton of TNT equivalent, and its multiples the kiloton, the megaton, and the gigaton. Often used in stating the power of very energetic events such as explosions and volcanic events and earthquakes and asteroid impacts. A gram of TNT as a unit of energy has been defined as 1000 thermochemical calories.
 The atom bomb dropped on Hiroshima. Its energy yield is often used in the public media and popular books as a unit of energy. (Its yield was roughly 13 kilotons, or 60 TJ.)
 One stick of dynamite.

Units of currency
A unit of measurement that applies to money is called a unit of account in economics and unit of measure in accounting. This is normally a currency issued by a country or a fraction thereof; for instance, the US dollar and US cent ( of a dollar), or the euro and euro cent.

ISO 4217 is the international standard describing three letter codes (also known as the currency code) to define the names of currencies established by the International Organization for Standardization (ISO).

Historical systems of measurement

Throughout history, many official systems of measurement have been used. While no longer in official use, some of these customary systems are occasionally used in day-to-day life, for instance in cooking.

Africa

 Algerian
 Egyptian
 Ethiopian
 Eritrean
 Guinean
 Libyan
 Malagasy
 Mauritian
 Moroccan
 Seychellois
 Somalian
 Tunisian
 South African
 Tanzanian

Asia

 Arabic
 Afgan
 Cambodian
 Chinese
 Hebrew (Biblical and Talmudic)
 Hindu
 Indonesian
 Japanese
 Korean
 Omani
 Pakistani
 Philippine
 Mesopotamian
 Persian
 Singaporean
 Sri Lankan
 Syrian
 Taiwanese
 Tamil
 Thai
 Vietnamese
 Nepalese

Still in use:
 Myanmar

Europe

 Ancient Greek
 Belgian
 Byzantine
 Czech
 Cypriot
 Danish
 Dutch
 English
 Estonian
 Finnish
 French (now)
 French (to 1795)
 German
 Greek
 Hungary
 Icelandic
Irish
 Italian
 Latvian
 Luxembourgian
 Maltese
 Norwegian
 Polish
 Portuguese
 Roman
 Romanian
 Russian
 Scottish
 Serbian
 Slovak
 Spanish
 Swedish
 Switzerland
 Turkish
 Tatar
 Welsh

North America

 Costa Rican
 Cuban
 Haitian
 Honduran
 Mexico
 Nicaraguan
Puerto Rican

South America

Argentine
Bolivian
Brazilian
Chilean
Colombian
Paraguayan
Peruvian
Uruguayan
Venezuelan

Ancient

Arabic
Biblical and Talmudic
Egyptian
Greek
Hindu
Indian
Mesopotamian
Persian
Roman

See also
 Conversion of units
 History of the metric system
 ISO 31
 Level of measurement
 Medieval weights and measures
 Megalithic yard
 Petrograd Standard
 Pseudoscientific metrology
 Unified Code for Units of Measure
 Weights and measures

Notes and references

Bibliography
 Tavernor, Robert (2007), Smoot's Ear: The Measure of Humanity,

External links

CLDR – Unicode localization of currency, date, time, numbers
A Dictionary of Units of Measurement
Old units of measure
Measures from Antiquity and the Bible 
Reasonover's Land Measures A Reference to Spanish and French land measures (and their English equivalents with conversion tables) used in North America
The Unified Code for Units of Measure

Measurement
Conceptual systems